Nanhai Tram Line 1 is a light rail line in Nanhai District, Foshan. Construction started in January 2014.

Opening timeline

Stations

Notes

References

Foshan Metro lines
Transport infrastructure under construction in China
Nanhai District